In mathematics, an -sphere or a hypersphere is a topological space that is homeomorphic to a standard -sphere, which is the set of points in -dimensional Euclidean space that are situated at a constant distance  from a fixed point, called the center. It is the generalization of an ordinary sphere in the ordinary three-dimensional space. The "radius" of a sphere is the constant distance of its points to the center. When the sphere has unit radius, it is usual to call it the unit -sphere or simply the -sphere for brevity. In terms of the standard norm, the -sphere is defined as

and an -sphere of radius  can be defined as 

An -sphere is the surface or boundary of an -dimensional ball.

In particular:
the pair of points at the ends of a (one-dimensional) line segment is a 0-sphere,
a circle, which is the one-dimensional circumference of a (two-dimensional) disk, is a 1-sphere,
the two-dimensional surface of a three-dimensional ball is a 2-sphere, often simply called a sphere,
the three-dimensional boundary of a (four-dimensional) 4-ball is a 3-sphere,
the-dimensional boundary of a (-dimensional) -ball is an -sphere.

For , the -spheres that are differential manifolds can be characterized (up to a diffeomorphism) as the simply connected -dimensional manifolds of constant, positive curvature. The -spheres admit several other topological descriptions: for example, they can be constructed by gluing two -dimensional Euclidean spaces together, by identifying the boundary of an -cube with a point, or (inductively) by forming the suspension of an -sphere. The 1-sphere is the 1-manifold that is a circle, which is not simply connected. The 0-sphere is the 0-manifold, which is not even connected, consisting of two points.

Description

For any natural number , an -sphere of radius  is defined as the set of points in -dimensional Euclidean space that are at distance  from some fixed point , where  may be any positive real number and where  may be any point in -dimensional space. In particular:
 a 0-sphere is a pair of points , and is the boundary of a line segment (1-ball).
 a 2-sphere is an ordinary 2-dimensional sphere in 3-dimensional Euclidean space, and is the boundary of an ordinary ball (3-ball).
 a 3-sphere is a 3-dimensional sphere in 4-dimensional Euclidean space.

Euclidean coordinates in -space 

The set of points in -space, that define an -sphere, is represented by the equation:

The above -sphere exists in -dimensional Euclidean space and is an example of an -manifold.  The volume form  of an -sphere of radius  is given by

where  is the Hodge star operator; see  for a discussion and proof of this formula in the case .  As a result,

-ball 

The space enclosed by an -sphere is called an -ball. An -ball is closed if it includes the -sphere, and it is open if it does not include the -sphere.

Specifically:
 A 1-ball, a line segment, is the interior of a 0-sphere.
 A 2-ball, a disk, is the interior of a circle (1-sphere).
 A 3-ball, an ordinary ball, is the interior of a sphere (2-sphere).
 A 4-ball is the interior of a 3-sphere, etc.

Topological description
Topologically, an -sphere can be constructed as a one-point compactification of -dimensional Euclidean space.
This forms the basis for stereographic projection.

Volume and surface area

The surfaces and volumes can also be given in closed form:

where  is the gamma function. Derivations of these equations are given in this section. 

In general, the volume of the -ball in -dimensional Euclidean space, and the surface area of the -sphere in -dimensional Euclidean space, of radius , are proportional to the th power of the radius,  (with different constants of proportionality that vary with ).

The volume of the unit -ball is maximal in dimension five, where it begins to decrease, and tends to zero as  tends to infinity. Furthermore, the sum of the volumes of even-dimensional -balls of radius  can be expressed in closed form:

For the odd-dimensional analogue,

where  is the error function.

Examples
The 0-ball consists of a single point. The 0-dimensional Hausdorff measure is the number of points in a set. So, 

The 0-sphere consists of its two end-points, . So,

The unit 1-ball is the interval  of length 2. So,

The unit 1-sphere is the unit circle  in the Euclidean plane, and this has circumference (1-dimensional measure)

The region enclosed by the unit 1-sphere is the 2-ball, or unit disc, and this has area (2-dimensional measure)

Analogously, in 3-dimensional Euclidean space, the surface area (2-dimensional measure) of the unit 2-sphere is given by

and the volume enclosed is the volume (3-dimensional measure) of the unit 3-ball, given by

Recurrences
The surface area, or properly the -dimensional volume, of the -sphere at the boundary of the -ball of radius  is related to the volume of the ball by the differential equation

or, equivalently, representing the unit -ball as a union of concentric -sphere shells,

So, 

We can also represent the unit -sphere as a union of products of a circle (1-sphere) with an -sphere. Then,

Since , the equation

holds for all .

This completes the derivation of the recurrences:

Closed forms
Combining the recurrences, we see that

So it is simple to show by induction on  that,

In general, the volume, in -dimensional Euclidean space, of the unit -ball, is given by

for the -dimensional surface of the sphere .

Other relations
The recurrences can be combined to give a "reverse-direction" recurrence relation for surface area, as depicted in the diagram:

Index-shifting  to  then yields the recurrence relations:

The recurrence relation for  can also be proved via integration with 2-dimensional polar coordinates:

Spherical coordinates

We may define a coordinate system in an -dimensional Euclidean space which is analogous to the spherical coordinate system defined for 3-dimensional Euclidean space, in which the coordinates consist of a radial coordinate , and  angular coordinates , where the angles  range over  radians (or over  degrees) and  ranges over  radians (or over  degrees).

 
Except in the special cases described below, the inverse transformation is unique:

Spherical volume and area elements
To express the volume element of -dimensional Euclidean space in terms of spherical coordinates, first observe that the Jacobian matrix of the transformation is:

The determinant of this matrix can be calculated by induction. The determinant of  can be calculated by Laplace expansion in the final column.

Induction then gives a closed-form expression for the volume element in spherical coordinates

The formula for the volume of the -ball can be derived from this by integration.

Similarly the surface area element of the -sphere of radius , which generalizes the area element of the 2-sphere, is given by

 

The natural choice of an orthogonal basis over the angular coordinates is a product of ultraspherical polynomials,

 

Polyspherical coordinates 
The standard spherical coordinate system arises from writing  as the product . These two factors may be related using polar coordinates.

can be transformed into a mixed polar–Cartesian coordinate system:

Repeating this decomposition eventually leads to the standard spherical coordinate system.

Polyspherical coordinate systems arise from a generalization of this construction. The space  is split as the product of two Euclidean spaces of smaller dimension, but neither space is required to be a line. Then . Using this decomposition, a point  may be written as

This can be transformed into a mixed polar–Cartesian coordinate system by writing:

The inverse transformation is

These splittings may be repeated as long as one of the factors involved has dimension two or greater. A polyspherical coordinate system is the result of repeating these splittings until there are no Cartesian coordinates left. The possible polyspherical coordinate systems correspond to binary trees with  leaves. Each non-leaf node in the tree corresponds to a splitting and determines an angular coordinate. The formulas for converting from polyspherical coordinates to Cartesian coordinates may be determined by finding the paths from the root to the leaf nodes. These formulas are products with one factor for each branch taken by the path. The inverse transformation, from polyspherical coordinates to Cartesian coordinates, is determined by grouping nodes. Every pair of nodes having a common parent can be converted from a mixed polar–Cartesian coordinate system to a Cartesian coordinate system using the above formulas for a splitting.

Polyspherical coordinates also have an interpretation in terms of the special orthogonal group.  A splitting  determines a subgroup

This is the subgroup that leaves each of the two factors  fixed.  Choosing a set of coset representatives for the quotient is the same as choosing representative angles for this step of the polyspherical coordinate decomposition.

There is one factor for each angle, and the volume measure on  also has a factor for the radial coordinate. The area measure has the form:

where the factors  are determined by the tree.  Similarly, the volume measure is

Suppose we have a node of the tree that corresponds to the decomposition  and that has angular coordinate . When the area measure is normalized so that the area of the sphere is 1, these factors are as follows. If , then

Stereographic projection 

Just as a two-dimensional sphere embedded in three dimensions can be mapped onto a two-dimensional plane by a stereographic projection, an -sphere can be mapped onto an -dimensional hyperplane by the -dimensional version of the stereographic projection. For example, the point  on a two-dimensional sphere of radius 1 maps to the point  on the -plane. In other words,

Likewise, the stereographic projection of an -sphere  of radius 1 will map to the -dimensional hyperplane  perpendicular to the -axis as

Generating random points

Uniformly at random on the -sphere 

To generate uniformly distributed random points on the unit -sphere (that is, the surface of the unit -ball),  gives the following algorithm.

Generate an -dimensional vector of normal deviates (it suffices to use , although in fact the choice of the variance is arbitrary), . Now calculate the "radius" of this point:

The vector  is uniformly distributed over the surface of the unit -ball.

This method becomes very inefficient for higher dimensions, as a vanishingly small fraction of the unit cube is contained in the sphere. In ten dimensions, less than 2% of the cube is filled by the sphere, so that typically more than 50 attempts will be needed.

Uniformly at random within the n-ball 
With a point selected uniformly at random from the surface of the unit -sphere (e.g., by using Marsaglia's algorithm), one needs only a radius to obtain a point uniformly at random from within the unit -ball.

Alternatively, points may be sampled uniformly from within the unit -ball by a reduction from the unit -sphere. In particular, if  is a point selected uniformly from the unit -sphere, then  is uniformly distributed within the unit -ball (i.e., by simply discarding two coordinates).

If  is sufficiently large, most of the volume of the -ball will be contained in the region very close to its surface, so a point selected from that volume will also probably be close to the surface.  This is one of the phenomena leading to the so-called curse of dimensionality that arises in some numerical and other applications.

Specific spheres

The only sphere that is not path-connected. Parallelizable.
 1-sphere  Commonly called a circle. Has a nontrivial fundamental group. Abelian Lie group structure ; the circle group. Homeomorphic to the real projective line. 
 2-sphere  Commonly simply called a sphere. For its complex structure, see Riemann sphere. Equivalent to the complex projective line
 3-sphere  Parallelizable, principal -bundle over the 2-sphere, Lie group structure .
 4-sphere  Equivalent to the quaternionic projective line, . .
 6-sphere  Possesses an almost complex structure coming from the set of pure unit octonions. . The question of whether it has a complex structure is known as the Hopf problem, after Heinz Hopf.
 7-sphere  Topological quasigroup structure as the set of unit octonions. Parallelizable. . The 7-sphere is of particular interest since it was in this dimension that the first exotic spheres were discovered.
 8-sphere  Equivalent to the octonionic projective line .
 23-sphere  A highly dense sphere-packing is possible in 24-dimensional space, which is related to the unique qualities of the Leech lattice.

Octahedral sphere 
The octahedral -sphere is defined similarly to the -sphere but using the 1-norm

In general, it takes the shape of a cross-polytope.

The octahedral 1-sphere is a square (without its interior). The octahedral 2-sphere is a regular octahedron; hence the name. The octahedral -sphere is the topological join of  pairs of isolated points. Intuitively, the topological join of two pairs is generated by drawing a segment between each point in one pair and each point in the other pair; this yields a square. To join this with a third pair, draw a segment between each point on the square and each point in the third pair; this gives a octahedron.

See also

Affine sphere
Conformal geometry
Exotic sphere
Homology sphere
Homotopy groups of spheres
Homotopy sphere
Hyperbolic group
Hypercube
Inversive geometry
Loop (topology)
Manifold
Möbius transformation
Orthogonal group
Spherical cap
Volume of an -ball
Wigner semicircle distribution

Notes

References

External links
 

Multi-dimensional geometry
Spheres